Vidora is an unincorporated community within the Rural Municipality of Reno No. 51, Saskatchewan, Canada. The community once had a population of 200 people in 1940 and has since declined to 1 resident. It previously held village status until it was dissolved as an unincorporated community on January 1, 1952. The community is located between Robsart and Consul on highway 21 & highway 13 known as the Red Coat Trail. Very little remains of the former village, only one home that is also used as a post office still stands as of 2008. There are many cement foundations and sidewalks still found scattered around the town site, including the remnants of the old bank vault to the former Municipality Office that was moved to Consul.

History 

In 1910 construction of the Canadian Pacific Railway line came through Vidora. Many of the CPR's engineers and surveyors were housed at a local farm house during construction of the rail line. Living at the same house where two girls named "Vivian" and "Dorothy", the engineers and surveyors decided to use their names to name the new area, because of their great hospitality, thus giving the town its name "Vidora".  After the land was named, settlers as well as bootleggers began to settle the area starting the community of Vidora. By 1917, the community was incorporated as a village, and now had its very own town Council, and mayor. After becoming a village, Vidora began to grow quite fast and prosperous. By 1920, the village business districts consist of more than twenty businesses, including businesses such as a post office, cafe, pool hall, main hall, banks, lumber yards, general stores, a hotel and a spectacular row of 5 grain elevators. Vidora even had its very own electrical power plant, powering the whole town.

Prior to January 1, 1952, Vidora was incorporated as a village, and was restructured as an unincorporated community under the jurisdiction of the Rural municipality of Reno on that date.

Prohibition 
Like most towns throughout Alberta and Saskatchewan, Vidora began as a small parcel of land owned by the Canadian Pacific Railway.  Like many towns of southwest Alberta and Saskatchewan such as Govenlock, Senate and Whiskey Gap, Alberta Vidora had a fair amount of bootleggers, that came into the area to smuggle rum, alcohol, and whisky across the border during Prohibition in the United States.

The Great Depression 

Vidora's future looked promising but due to the Great Depression years, with accompanying droughts, falling grain prices and poor crop yields, Vidora's population slowly began to decline. Beginning in 1924 a devastating fire destroyed many important businesses including Vidora's first store, post office, cafe, pool hall and main hall. Then in 1926 and 1928 more vital businesses would also be wiped out by fire.  In 1936 the C.P.R. station closed and afterwards moved to Frontier.  In 1961 the Vidora General Store was moved to Robsart, then in 1969 the rural municipal office was also moved to Consul as did the Vidora Community Hall in 1976. To mark the end of its long prosperous life, Vidora's five grain elevators closed and were torn down sometime in the 1970s or 1980s.

Notable people 

 Lee Morrison, (born 6 March 1932 in Vidora, Saskatchewan) was a member of the House of Commons of Canada from 1993 to 2000.

See also 

 List of communities in Saskatchewan
 List of ghost towns in Canada
 Ghost towns in Saskatchewan
 List of geographic names derived from portmanteaus
 Prohibition in Canada

References 

Reno No. 51, Saskatchewan
Former villages in Saskatchewan
Unincorporated communities in Saskatchewan
Populated places established in 1910
Ghost towns in Saskatchewan
Division No. 4, Saskatchewan